KDUT (102.3 FM) is a radio station  broadcasting a Regional Mexican format. Licensed to Randolph, Utah, United States, the station serves the Salt Lake City area. The station is owned by Alpha Media.

History

Active rock (1999-2004) 
The station went on the air as KAIO on January 22, 1999. On December 21, 1999, the station changed its call sign to KWKD and began airing an Active Rock format branding itself as The Blaze. On December 20, 2003, it became KMDG, branding itself as Mad Dog 102.3, still with an active rock format.

Spanish (2004-present) 
On April 3, 2004, the current call letters were put in place.

Bustos Media used to own the station. In September 2010, Bustos transferred most of its licenses to Adelante Media Group as part of a settlement with its lenders. Alpha Media bought Adelante's Salt Lake City stations for $3.15 million on July 16, 2015.

References

External links

DUT
Alpha Media radio stations